No. 652 Squadron AAC is a squadron of the British Army's Army Air Corps (AAC).

History

The squadron was transferred to the Army on 1 September 1957 while the unit was in Germany. Between 1966 and October 1969 the unit was employed as 1 Division Army Aviation HQ.

During the Cold War, the squadron was part of No. 2 Regiment AAC (along with 662 Sqn), the two squadrons were at different locations, 662 Sqn was at Münster, and 652 was at Bünde. About 1984, as a result of changing the structure of AAC Regiments, 2 Regiment was disbanded and 652 Sqn became part of 1 Regiment AAC at Hildesheim, Germany - each regiment now consisting of three squadrons and a HQ Troop. Sometime after 1990, 1 Regiment moved to Gutersloh, Germany.

Deployments
 Between September 1984 and February 1985, the unit deployed to the Falkland Islands being split between Goose Green and Port Stanley.
 Between September 2004 and October 2007, the unit deployed two times to Iraq (Operation Telic) with Westland Lynx's.
 Between September 2011 and January 2012, 652 Sqn deployed to Afghanistan (Operation Herrick) with Lynx AH.9's.

Between January 1974 and May 1974 the Squadron was deployed to Northern Ireland (Op. Banner) operating six Westland Scouts from Longkesh army base.

Between November 1975 and March 1976 the Squadron was deployed to Northern Ireland (Op. Banner) operating six Westland Scouts from Longkesh army base.

Present day

The unit converted to the AgustaWestland Wildcat AH.1 and moved to RNAS Yeovilton becoming the Wildcat Fielding Squadron, training aircrews.

See also

 List of Army Air Corps aircraft units

References

Citations

Bibliography

External links

Army Air Corps aircraft squadrons
Military units and formations established in 1957